Netherlands–Russia relations is the relationships between the two countries, the Kingdom of the Netherlands and The Russian Federation. Russia has an embassy in The Hague, and the Netherlands has an embassy in Moscow, a consulate in Saint Petersburg, and an honorary consulate in Yuzhno-Sakhalinsk.

Since the year 2013 the political relations have become strained due to a number of conflicts and incidents, the most prominent being the annexation of Crimea in 2014, the shooting down of MH17 in 2014 that killed 193 Dutch nationals, and the war in Donbass.

In October 2018, the Russian Ambassador to the Netherlands was summoned to the Ministry of Foreign Affairs as the Dutch accused four Russians with diplomatic passports for attempting to carry out a cyber-attack in April on the headquarters of Organisation for the Prohibition of Chemical Weapons in The Hague. Ank Bijleveld told Dutch broadcaster NPO that the Netherlands is in a state of "cyberwar" with Russia.

History

During the time of Peter the Great
Peter the Great whilst on his tour of western Europe (1697-1698) visited the Netherlands and practised as a shipwright in Zaandam. During his stay he managed to recruit some Dutch maritime expertise for the newly established Russian navy. One of the most notable Dutch members of the Russian navy was the Norwegian-born captain Cornelius Cruys, who after several years of service reached the rank of admiral and became the first commander of the Baltic Fleet.

Napoleonic Wars
Tsar Alexander I of Russia played a central role in the restoration of the Netherlands. Alexander promised to support Prince William and help restore an independent Netherlands with William as king. Russian and Prussian troops drove out the French in 1813.

From the revolution until the Cold War
Since the Russian Revolution, the Netherlands did not have any diplomatic relationships with the Soviet Union until the end of the Second World War. During the war, the Dutch government was in exile.

During WW2, 25.000 Dutch volunteers joined the Waffen SS, and fought on the Eastern front against the Soviet Union. They were not supported by the government in exile.

During the Cold War
During the Cold War, all the Dutch consecutive governments perceived the Soviet Union and the Warsaw pact as a threat to its safety.

Russian Federation

As the Netherlands is a member of the European Union, the relation between Russia and the Netherlands is closely related to the Russia–European Union relations.

In October 2011 president Dmitry Medvedev met in the Kremlin with the Prime Minister of Netherlands Mark Rutte to discuss bilateral ties.

Aside from commerce and politics, there have been some notable Dutch influence on Russian football, with Guus Hiddink in 2006–2010 followed by Dick Advocaat in 2010–2012 as head coach of the Russian national team.

In the year 2013 a number of cultural activities took place in the Netherlands and Russia to celebrate 400 years of diplomatic ties. Russian president Vladimir Putin visited Amsterdam. In October 2013, the ties between the countries were strained when a group of Greenpeace activists were arrested during a protest on an Arctic oil rig owned by Gazprom. On October 9, the minister counsellor Dmitri Borodin, working at the Russian embassy in The Hague, was detained after allegations of abusing his children. Dutch minister of foreign affairs Frans Timmermans apologized later for the violation of the Vienna Convention on Diplomatic Relations. Subsequently, on October 15, the Dutch diplomat Onno Elderenbosch was physically attacked in his apartment in Moscow by two men posing as electricians.
During the 2014 Sochi Olympic Games, Vladimir Putin visited the Holland Heineken House and drank a beer with King Willem Alexander.

Since March 2014 the Netherlands participated in the European Union economic sanctions against Russia due to the Ukraine crisis. In August 2014 Russia installed a retaliatory boycott of EU agricultural products.

Relations were further strained when Malaysia Airlines Flight 17, an airliner carrying 193 Dutch nationals, was shot down over Eastern Ukraine in July 2014, by a BUK missile launcher. A few years later, a Dutch court found two Russians and a Ukrainian guilty. It is unlikely that these people will serve their sentences. 

After the 2022 Russian invasion of Ukraine started, the Netherlands, as one of the EU countries, imposed sanctions on Russia, and Russia added all EU countries to the list of "unfriendly nations". 

In 2022, Russia’s Foreign Ministry summoned the Dutch ambassador to protest at what it said was an attempt by British intelligence to recruit the Russian military attache at the Russian embassy in The Hague.

Notable Russians in the Netherlands
Peter the Great
Anna Pavlovna of Russia
Anish Giri

Notable Dutch in Russia
Dick Advocaat
Willem Barentsz
Cornelius Cruys
Guus Hiddink
André Kuipers astronaut.
Karel van het Reve slavicist, essayist, correspondent of the Parool Dutch newspaper in the Soviet Union, ex-communist, influential anti-communist in the Netherlands.
Derk Sauer Dutch entrepreneur, founder of the Moscow Times and many other popular magazines in Russia.
Andrew Vinius

See also
Foreign relations of the Netherlands
Foreign relations of Russia
Communist Party of the Netherlands
Greenpeace Arctic Sunrise ship case
Czar Peter House (Netherlands)
Nicolaes Witsen
Sakhalin II
Vriezenveen
Hermitage Amsterdam

References

External links
Russian embassy in the Netherlands
Dutch embassy in Moscow
Rus trade
Russia trade and economy Dutch government website with links to data about Russian-Dutch trade

 
Bilateral relations of Russia
Russia